Ulisse Carlo Bascherini (2 April 1844 – 16 May 1933) was a Roman Catholic prelate who served as Bishop of Grosseto (1907–1920).

Biography
Ulisse Carlo Bascherini was born on 2 April 1844 in Corvaia, a small hamlet near Seravezza, Tuscany.

He was appointed Bishop of Grosseto on 8 July 1907 by Pope Pius X and consecrated on 17 August by cardinal Pietro Maffi. He retired from the diocese on 8 March 1920, and was appointed titular bishop of Amathus in Cyprus by Pope Benedict XV. He died on 16 May 1933.

References

Sources

Minucci, Giotto (1988). La città di Grosseto e i suoi vescovi (498-1988) [The city of Grosseto and its bishops (498-1988)]. Florence: Lucio Pugliese.

External links
 (for Chronology of Bishops) 
 (for Chronology of Bishops)  

20th-century Italian Roman Catholic bishops
Bishops appointed by Pope Pius X
Bishops of Grosseto
1884 births
1933 deaths